WWE Hall of Fame (2010) was the event which featured the introduction of the 11th class to the WWE Hall of Fame. The event was produced by World Wrestling Entertainment (WWE) on March 27, 2010 from the Dodge Theatre in Phoenix, Arizona. The event took place the same weekend as WrestleMania XXVI. The event was hosted by Jerry Lawler. A condensed one-hour version of the ceremony aired on the USA Network that same evening. In March 2015 the ceremony was added to the WWE Network.

Inductees

Individual
 Class headliners appear in boldface

Celebrity

References

WWE Hall of Fame ceremonies
2010 in professional wrestling
2010 in Arizona
Events in Phoenix, Arizona
Professional wrestling in Phoenix, Arizona
March 2010 events in the United States